Bangalaia lislei is a species of beetle in the family Cerambycidae. It was described by Villiers in 1941. It is known from Cameroon.

References

Endemic fauna of Cameroon
Prosopocerini
Beetles described in 1941